Ahrensburg is a town in the district of Stormarn, Schleswig-Holstein, Germany. It is located northeast of Hamburg and is part of the Hamburg Metropolitan Region. Its population is around 31,000. Schloss Ahrensburg, the town's symbol, is a Renaissance castle dating from 1595.

Geography
Ahrensburg is situated in the Tunneltal, in which Alfred Rust excavated many items dating back to the ice age.

Ahrensburg is situated next to the Autobahn A1 and on the railway route between the Hanseatic cities of Hamburg and Lübeck.

History

Early history
The Ahrensburger Tunneltal is a place of numerous excavations from the Upper Paleolithic culture. The culture is called Ahrensburg culture by archaeologists.

Middle Ages
The town dates back to the 13th Century, when the Counts of Schauenburg founded the village of Woldenhorn (which later became the town of Ahrensburg) and the neighbouring villages Ahrensfelde, Meilsdorf and Beimoor. Woldenhorn is first mentioned in the year 1314. The village came into the possession of the Cistercian Reinfeld Abbey in 1327, and Woldenhorn became the seat of the monastery reeve until the middle of the 16th century.

The "Arx Arnsburga", also called Arnesvelde castle, was built around the year 1200. Ruins of the castle are still visible in the Hagen forest to the south of the town. The town coat of arms shows the castle in the upper field. There are records of reeves based in the castle in 1295 and 1304. In 1326, Count John III of Schauenburg had his reeve relocated to Trittau and abandoned the castle.

Modern period
After the dissolution of the monasteries  due to the Reformation, the whole area came into the possession of the king of Denmark. He rewarded his general Daniel Rantzau 1567 with lordship over these villages. His brother and heir Peter Rantzau built the Renaissance Ahrensburg Palace in the form of a water castle, now the symbol of the town, and the castle church around 1595. The construction of almshouses directly by the church was exemplary.

The "Ahrensburg Estate" belonged to the so-called Noble Estates, which possessed a large amount of freedom and self-administration.

The Rantzaus' estate was heavily indebted by the middle of the 18th century and, in 1759, was acquired by the businessman Heinrich Carl von Schimmelmann. Schimmelmann remodelled the castle and village in the baroque style and the current layout of the town reflects these plans.

On the 7 June 1867 the estate village Woldenhorn became an independent Prussian country community and renamed itself Ahrensburg after a decision by the community council. It belonged to the "Amt Ahrensburg", from which the "amtsfreie" community once more seceded in 1912.

The construction of the railway between Hamburg and Lübeck in the year 1865 made Ahrensburg a popular destination for outings outside Hamburg and the number of inhabitants increased. By 1910, the population had reached 2,750. The incorporation of various surrounding communities in the year 1928 led to an increase in the town area to about 5 km2.

Building of the settlements "Daheim/Heimgarten" (partially on the territory of the current community of Ammersbek) and "Am Hagen" (originally called "Franz Seldte Settlement") commenced in 1933. The rush of settlers from around Hamburg lead to the creation of the current housing layout.

When Ahrensburg received city rights in 1949, the town had some 17,775 inhabitants – around half of which were refugees from the former eastern German regions.

Erica Keck, who was elected mayor in 1950, became the first female elected mayor in Germany.

Religion
Ahrensburg was the seat of the Stormarn Provost of the Lutheran church from 1823 until 1899.

Ahrensburg had a small Jewish community until the beginning of the 1930s. The Synagogue was burnt down in the Kristallnacht in 1938 during the period of Nazism. The Jewish cemetery (opened in 1822) can still be seen at the edge of town (Ahrensburg-West).

Politics
Since the local election on 26 May 2013, the town council is made up as follows:

Twin towns – sister cities

Ahrensburg is twinned with:
 Esplugues de Llobregat, Spain
 Feldkirchen in Kärnten, Austria
 Ludwigslust, Germany
 Viljandi, Estonia

Honorary citizen
 1965 – Alfred Rust, (1900–1983), archeologist, controversial because of his membership in the NS-group Ahnenerbe

Notable people
 Waldemar Bonsels (1880–1952), author of  Maya the Bee and her adventures 
 Jonathan Meese (born 1970), artist, grew up in Ahrensburg, attended the Stormarn School and lives in Ahrensburg
 Stacie Ahrens (born 1971), artist, author
 Christian Bass (born 1978), writer, photographer, poet

Personalities who are associated with the city
 Dagmar Berghoff (born 1943), television presenter and actress
 Wolfgang Kieling (1924–1987), actor
 Hellmuth von Mücke (1881–1957), naval officer, politician and writer
 Benedikt Pliquett (born 1984), goalkeeper 
 Christian Tümpel (1937–2009), university lecturer, theologian and art historian in Nijmegen
 Daniela Ziegler (born 1948), actress
 Axel Zwingenberger (born 1955), boogie-woogie pianist

References

External links

 evj-ahrensburg.de
 
 Schloss Ahrensburg
 ahrensburg.wiki

 
Towns in Schleswig-Holstein
Stormarn (district)
Holocaust locations in Germany